Wikipedia is a free, collaborative, multilingual Internet encyclopedia.

Wikipedia may also refer to:
 274301 Wikipedia, an asteroid
 A song by American singer Jean Deaux
 A song by Swedish rapper Jireel
 English Wikipedia, Wikipedia's first and largest edition
 Wikipedia community, a community of contributors to the online encyclopaedia 

 Wikipedia namespace, see Wikipedia:Project namespace

See also
 
 List of Wikipedias
 Wiki (disambiguation)